is a city located in Aichi Prefecture, Japan. , the city had an estimated population of 113,698 in 51,035 households, and a population density of 2,618 persons per km².

Geography
Tōkai is located in the far northwestern neck of Chita Peninsula in southern Aichi Prefecture, and is bordered by  Ise Bay to the east, and the metropolis of Nagoya to the north. It extends 8.06 kilometers from east to west and 10.97 kilometers from north to south. Much of the city is near sea level in altitude.

Climate
The city has a climate characterized by hot and humid summers, and relatively mild winters (Köppen climate classification Cfa).  The average annual temperature in Tōkai is 15.7 °C. The average annual rainfall is 1730 mm with September as the wettest month. The temperatures are highest on average in August, at around 27.9 °C, and lowest in January, at around 4.5 °C.

Demographics
Per Japanese census data, the population of Tōkai greatly expanded in the 1960s, and has continued to grow at a reduced rate from that period over the past 50 years.

Neighboring municipalities
Aichi Prefecture
Nagoya  (Minami-ku, Minato-ku, Midori-ku)
Ōbu
Chita
Higashiura

History

Early modern period
During the Edo period, the area around Tōkai consisted of a number of fishing settlements and was governed as part of Owari Domain under the Tokugawa shogunate.

Late modern period
With the establishment of the modern municipalities system after the start of the Meiji period, the area was organized into a number of villages within Chita District, Aichi.

Contemporary history
The city of Tōkai was established on April 1, 1969, through the merger of the former towns of Yokosuka and Ueno  within Chita District.

Government

Tōkai has a mayor-council form of government with a directly elected mayor and a unicameral city legislature of 22 members. The city contributes two members to the Aichi Prefectural Assembly.  In terms of national politics, the city is part of Aichi District 8 of the lower house of the Diet of Japan.

External relations

Twin towns – Sister cities

International
Sister cities
Nilüfer（Bursa Province, Turkey）
since May 10, 2007
Shire of Macedon Ranges（Victoria, Australia）
since October 16, 2014

National
Sister cities
Yonezawa（Yamagata Prefecture, Tōhoku region）
since October 20, 1999
Kamaishi（Iwate Prefecture, Tōhoku region）
since March 24, 2007
Okinawa（Okinawa Prefecture, Kyūshū region）
since November 20, 2009

Economy

Secondary sector of the economy

Manufacturing
Tōkai has a strong industrial base along its coastline, dominated by a large steel mill owned by Nippon Steel and by Aichi Steel, which has its headquarters and three manufacturing plants in the city.

Education

Universities
Seijoh University
Nihon Fukushi University – Tokai campus

Schools
Tōkai has twelve public elementary schools and six public middle schools operated by the city government and three public high schools operated by the Aichi Prefectural Board of Education.

Transportation

Railways

Conventional lines
 Meitetsu
Tokoname Line：-  -  -  -  -  -
Kōwa Line：-  -  -  -  -

Roads

Expressways
 Isewangan Expressway
 Chitahantō Road (no interchange)
 Nagoya Expressway Route 4

Japan National Route

Local attractions

Tourist attraction
Temples
Gyokurin-ji
Kanpuku-ji
Miroku-ji

Parks
Shurakuen Park
Oike Park

Museums
GAS ENERGY EXHIBIT HALL
Heisyu Memorial Hall
KAGOME Memorial Hall
The Reverend Mr.ICHITAROU TOMATO Memorial Hall

Culture

Festivals
Ōta Festival
Owari-Yokosuka Matsuri

Notable people from Tōkai 
Dragon Kid, professional wrestler
Kamakichi Kishinouye, biologist
Tomohiro Kondo, professional golfer
Aoi Morikawa, Actor and Model

References

External links

  

 
Cities in Aichi Prefecture
Populated coastal places in Japan